Lucy Owen (born 18 June 1971 as Lucy Jane Cohen) is a Welsh television news reader.

Early life
Owen attended Howell's School in Llandaff, Cardiff, and graduated from Royal Holloway, University of London, in English. She is of Jewish heritage.

Career
Owen began her broadcasting career at BBC Radio Wales as a researcher, later progressing to a reporting and co-presenting role for a features programme. She joined HTV Wales in 1995 as a newsreader for regional opt-outs during GMTV, and between 1996 and 2007, she co-presented Wales Tonight, the regional news programme on ITV Wales, broadcast from Cardiff.

Owen presented on the now defunct ITV News Channel, and was also seen anchoring the main ITV News: Lunchtime News, Evening News and Weekend News. Owen signed off from her last edition of Wales Tonight on Friday 19 October 2007.
From Monday 5 November 2007 Owen began presenting the BBC Wales evening news programme BBC Wales Today, replacing long-standing presenter Sara Edwards. To Owen's surprise it then came to light that she was following in her late father – Jeff Cohen's – footsteps as he had worked as an occasional freelance newsreader on Wales Today in 1962 whilst establishing his estate agency business. As a result of the channel move, Owen also joined her husband on the team of BAFTA award-winning X-Ray. Since 2016, she has co-hosted X-Ray with Rachel Treadway-Williams and comedian Omar Hamdi.

Owen was one of eight people chosen to participate in a week learning Welsh on a campsite in Pembrokeshire in the series cariad@iaith:love4language shown on S4C in May 2012.

Personal life
Owen married fellow Welsh television presenter Rhodri Owen in June 2004 at St Andrew's Church in St Andrews Major near Dinas Powys. The couple co-parent together in Llangan, and London. After trying to conceive, the couple undertook treatment via IVF. Their Child, Gabriel was born on 10 March 2008 by Caesarean section, weighing 5 lb 12oz (2.3 kg).

Owen has worked with St John Ambulance, and Bobath Children's Therapy Centre Wales, which provides specialist Bobath therapy to children who have cerebral palsy; she is also an ambassador for Tŷ Hafan, the hospice for children in Wales, and the Prince's Trust in Wales.

References

External links

Bio at Knight Ayton
Bobath Children's Therapy Centre Wales

1971 births
Living people
Alumni of Royal Holloway, University of London
ITV regional newsreaders and journalists
ITN newsreaders and journalists
BBC Cymru Wales newsreaders and journalists
People from Llandaff
People educated at Howell's School Llandaff
British Jews